A balance bicycle, run bike or no pedal bike or dandy horse is a training bicycle that helps children learn balance and steering. It has no foot pedals, no drivetrain, no chain, no gears, no gear shifters, no derailleurs, and no freewheel.

Designs

Balance bikes have been made out of both metal and wood. It can be a normal bicycle with pedals and related parts removed, or it can be purpose-built (especially for very small children, for whom normal bicycles are generally not available). Some are fitted with brakes and come with either air tires or solid foam tires. Most commercially available designs have flat handlebars.

To function properly, a balance bicycle must be small enough for the rider to be able to walk the bicycle while sitting comfortably in the saddle, putting both feet flat on the ground.  The rider first walks the bicycle while standing over the saddle, then while sitting in the saddle.  Eventually, the rider feels comfortable enough to run and "scoot" while riding the bicycle, then to lift both feet off the ground and cruise while balancing on the two wheels.

Learning method
Manufacturers of balance bicycles say that children can learn to bicycle faster because they learn to balance and countersteer first and then to pedal later, and that training wheels slow learning because kids become too dependent on them, acquiring bad habits. Training wheels that prevent the bike from leaning also prevent countersteering, so that, as with a tricycle, kids learn to turn the handlebars the wrong way, which must be unlearned later. Some balance bikes come with a rear brake and a footrest. This allows a child to practice using a brake safely before they progress to a pedal bike. The footrest is in the same place as the pedals which makes for a quick transition between balance bike and pedal bike. 

Sheldon Brown wrote that training wheels can become an obstacle to learning if they are adjusted incorrectly, because they prevent the bike from leaning if they are too low, and can inhibit braking if too much weight is taken off the rear wheel by training wheels that are too low. Adjusting training wheels correctly, and raising them higher as the child's skill increases, avoids these problems. Balance bikes with no brakes at all except the rider's feet might stop poorly as well, though very young children might not use brakes effectively anyway. Brown recommended simply removing the pedals from a normal kid's bicycle, avoiding the extra expense of a balance bike, and parents have had success with this approach. USA Cycling President Derek Bouchard-Hall said in a Wall Street Journal article that balance bikes "have made training wheels obsolete."

Balance bikes have also been recommended as learning aids for adults, and as useful for elderly people who have difficulty in walking.

History

The first balance bicycle was the dandy horse, and was invented by Karl Drais, the earliest form of a two-wheeler - without pedals. His first reported ride from Mannheim to Rheinau (now a section of Mannheim) took place on June 12, 1817.  Drais was a German inventor and invented the Laufmaschine ("running machine"), also later called the velocipede, draisine (English) or "draisienne" (French), or nicknamed, dandy horse. This incorporated the two-wheeler principle that is basic to the bicycle and motorcycle and meant the beginning of mechanized personal transport. In 1997, German designer Rolf Mertens developed the first commercially produced Laufrad "running bike" called LIKEaBIKE.

See also 
 Dandy horse, a 19th Century precursor of the bicycle with no pedals
 Jyrobike
 Kick bike
 Outline of cycling

References

Physical activity and dexterity toys
Road cycles
Educational toys

de:Draisine (Laufmaschine)#Kinderlaufrad